An Election to the Edinburgh Corporation was held on 7 May 1968, alongside municipal elections across Scotland. Of the councils 69 seats, 22 were up for election. Despite receiving the most votes of any single party, the SNP won only 7 seats. Unlike in Glasgow, the Progressives and Conservatives did not run on a joint ticket. Despite that however the parties only ran competing candidates in the Gorgie-Dalry ward.

Following the election Edinburgh Corporation was composed of 34 Progressives (including the Lord Provost), 21 Labour councillors, 8 SNP councillors, 3 Conservatives, 1 Liberal, and 1 independent. Following the election the Progressive/Conservative coalition controlled the council with a majority of 6.

No election was held in the Holyrood ward, where the sitting Labour councillor died the week before the election.

Turnout was 140,987.

Aggregate results

Ward Results

References

1968
1968 Scottish local elections